Malcolm McPherson (born 9 December 1974) is a Scottish football coach and former footballer who played professionally in the Football League for Brentford. He is the current manager of New Zealand club North Shore United AFC.

Career

Playing career
His playing career started at Yeovil Town where he made his debut at 17 in the 1992–93 season. After three seasons at the club, West Ham United bought McPherson for £30,000 in a three-year deal, which, dependent upon appearances, would have risen to £200,000. His time at Upton Park was riddled with injury; the longest period of fitness being three months. He was restricted to reserve team games.

After loan spells with Dagenham & Redbridge and Swedish Premier Division side IFK Norrköping he turned down a year's contract extension at the premier league club West Ham. He signed for Brentford, reaching the Division One play off final at Wembley, losing in the final to Crewe Alexandra in 1996–97 season. In the 1997–98 season Brentford, were relegated under the management of Micky Adams from Division Two to Division Three. McPherson had torn his thigh muscle and at the end of the season he left Brentford.

Coaching career
McPherson has coached in New Zealand with Waitakere United, and as of July 2019, was the Head Coach for North Shore United in Auckland.

Honours 
North Shore United
NRFL Premier: 2019

References

External links

Yeovil Town statistics

1974 births
Living people
Footballers from Glasgow
Scottish footballers
Yeovil Town F.C. players
West Ham United F.C. players
Brentford F.C. players
Dagenham & Redbridge F.C. players
IFK Norrköping players
English Football League players
Allsvenskan players
Association football forwards
Scottish expatriate sportspeople in Sweden
Scottish expatriate sportspeople in New Zealand
Scottish expatriate footballers
Expatriate footballers in Sweden
Scottish expatriate football managers
Scottish football managers